This is an incomplete list of roads in Macau.

Roads in Macau use Portuguese spelling and are named after historic figures or places in Macau or Portugal. There are 321 kilometres of roads in Macau maintained by the Land, Public Works and Transport Bureau (DSSOPT), Municipal Affairs Bureau (IAM), and the Transport Bureau (DSAT).

Signage

Road signs in Macau are in Portuguese and traditional Chinese. They consist of white tiles attached on concrete posts or on walls of buildings. Signage on bridges is white with black lettering (Portuguese and Chinese).

Naming
In some cases road names are the same in meaning for both Portuguese name and Chinese name. However, there are some cases where Portuguese and Chinese meaning differ, such as Praceta de 24 Junho (Plaza of June 24) which is shown as 城市日前地, which translates as City Day Plaza instead.

Road Types
 Estrada – Road
 Rua – Street
 Pátio – Yard
 Avenida – Avenue

Macau has 50 km of paved roads (estradas) in areas that permit wide roadways. Most of the roads in Macau and parts of Taipa are narrow side streets. Highways in Macau are semi controlled access roadways and the maximum speed is 80 km/hr.

List of Roads on Macau Peninsula

Street (Rua)
 Ramal dos Mouros – named for Castle of the Moors in Sintra, Portugal
 Rua 25 de Abril – named for the Carnation Revolution of 1974
 Rua do Almirante Sérgio
 Rua de Berlim
 Rua de Bruxelas
 Rua do Campo   
 Rua do Canal Novo   
 Rua do Caracol
 Rua Central
 Rua Cidade de Braga – named for Braga
 Rua Cidade de Coimbra – named for Coimbra
 Rua Cidade do Porto – named for Porto
 Rua Cidade de Santarém – named for Santarém, Portugal
 Rua Cidade de Sintra – named for Sintra
 Rua da Concórdia
 Rua do Dr. Lourenço Marques
 Rua das Estalagens
 Rua da Fábrica
 Rua da Felicidade
 Rua de Fernão Mendes Pinto
 Rua da Grunta
 Rua dos Hortelãos
 Rua do Lago Sai Van
 Rua de Londres – named for London
 Rua da Madeira – named for Madeira
 Rua da Malaca – named for Malacca
 Rua do Miradouro de Santa Sancha
 Rua Norte do Patane
 Rua Oeste de Entre Lagos
 Rua da Papaia   
 Rua de Paris – named for Paris, France
 Rua de Pequim – named for Beijing, China  
 Rua da Piedade
 Rua de Roma – named for Rome, Italy
 Rua do Patane   
 Rua de Sanches de Miranda
 Rua São Tiago da Barra
 Rua Sul do Patane 
 Rua Va Tai
 Rua de Madrid – named for Madrid, Spain

Roundabout and Square (Rotunda, Largo, Praceta and Praça)
 Adro de S. Lázaro
 Largo de Santo Agostinho
 Largo do S. Domingos
 Largo do Senado
 Largo do Terminal Marítimo
 Praça da Assembleia Legislativa
 Praça Ferreira do Amaral
 Praça de Jorge Álvares
 Praça do Lago Sai Van
 Praça de Luís de Camões
 Praça de Ponte e Horta
 Praça das Portas do Cerco
 Praceta de 1 de Outubro
 Praceta 24 de Junho – named for the date in which Portugal won the Battle of Macau
 Praceta 25 de Abril – named for the Carnation Revolution
 Praceta do Bom Sucesso
 Praceta Central Froneiriça de Hong Kong-Zhuhai-Macau
 Praceta de Miramar
 Praceta do Museu de Macau
 Praceta do Parque Industrial
 Praceta da Serenidade
 Praceta de Venceslau de Morais
 Rotunda do Almirante Costa Cabral
 Rotunda de Carlos da Maia
 Rotunda de Hou Kong
 Rotunda de S. João Bosco

Alley, Crescent and Lane (Beco, Pátio and Travessa)
 Travessa da Praia

Avenue and Road (Avenida and Estrada)

Avenida (Avenue)

 Avenida 1° de Maio – named for May Day
 Avenida 24 de Junho – named for the date in which Portugal won the Battle of Macau
 Avenida Almeida Ribeiro
 Avenida do Almirante Lacerda
 Avenida da Amizade
 Avenida do Comendador Ho Yin
 Avenida Comercial de Macau
 Avenida do Conselheiro Borja – Governor of Macau Custódio Miguel de Borja
 Avenida do Conselheiro Ferreira de Almeida
 Avenida do Coronel Mesquita
 Avenida D. João IV – named for King of Portugal John IV of Portugal
 Avenida Doutor Ma Man Kei
 Avenida Doutor Mário Soares – named for former Prime Minister and President of Portugal Mário Soares
 Avenida do Doutor Rodrigo Rodrigues 
 Avenida Doutor Stanley Ho – named for Macau billionaire and casino owner Dr Stanley Ho
 Avenida Dr. Sun Yat-sen – named for Chinese revolutionary leader Sun Yat-sen
 Avenida do Governador Jaime Silvério Marques – named for Governor of Macau Jamie Silvério Marques
 Avenida de Horta e Costa – named after José Maria de Sousa Horta e Costa
 Avenida do Hipódromo
 Avenida Infante D. Henrique – named for Portuguese explorer Henry the Navigator
 Avenida Marginal do Lam Mau
 Avenida Marginal do Patane
 Avenida Norte do Hipódromo 
 Avenida Leste do Hipódromo
 Avenida Longevidade
 Avenida do Ouvidor Arriaga
 Avenida Panorâmica do Lago Nam Van
 Avenida Panorâmica do Lago Sai Van
 Avenida da Ponte da Amizade
 Avenida da Praia Grande  
 Avenida da República
 Avenida de Sagres
 Avenida de Sidónio Pais
 Avenida Sir Andres Ljungstedt – named for Swedish merchant Anders Ljungstedt who refuted the Portuguese claim over Macau
 Avenida de Tun Seng
 Avenida de Venceslau de Morais – named for Portuguese writer Wenceslau de Moraes

Estrada (Road)
 Estrada Dona Maria II – named for Maria II of Portugal, Queen regnant 
 Estrada da Areia Preta – Areia Preta translates as Black sand
 Estrada do Campo
 Estrada do Engenheiro Trigo
 Estrada Marginal da Areia Preta – Marginal da Areia Preta translates as Seafront Black sand
 Estrada Nova
 Estrada da Penha – Penha translates as cliff or rocky hill
 Estrada de S. Francisco
 Estrada do Visconde de S. Januário
 Estrada da Vitória

Boulevard or Promenade (Alameda)
 Alameda Dr Carlos d'Assumpção – named for late Chairman of the Macau Legislative Assembly and a member of the Fundação Oriente's Consultative Committee
 Alameda da Tranquilidade

Ramp (Calçada and Rampa)
 Calcada do Amparo
 Calçada da Barra
 Calçada do Bom Jesus
 Calçada do Bom Parto
 Calçada do botelho
 Calçada Central de S. Lázaro
 Calçada das Chácaras
 Calçada do Embaixador
 Calçada de Eugénio Gonçalves
 Calçada da Feitoria
 Calçada de Francisco António
 Calçada do Gaio
 Calçada do Galo
 Calçada da Igreja de S. Lázaro
 Calçada do Januário
 Calçada do Lilau
 Calçada do Monte
 Calçada da Paz
 Calçada da Penha
 Calçada do Poço
 Calçada da Praia
 Calçada dos Quartéis
 Calçada dos Remédios
 Calçada da Rocha
 Calçada de Santo Agostinho
 Calçada de S. Francisco Xavier
 Calçada de S. João
 Calçada de S. Paulo
 Calçada das Sortes
 Calçada da Surpresa
 Calçada do Teatro – named for Dom Pedro V Theatre
 Calçada do Tronco Velho
 Calçada das Verdades
 Calçada do Visconde de S. Januário
 Calçada da Vitória
 Rampa da Barra
 Rampa dos Cavaleiros
 Rampa de D. Maria II
 Rampa do Forte de Mong Há
 Rampa da Guia
 Rampa do Padre Vasconcelos
 Rampa da Penha
 Rampa do Reservatório

Stairs or Steps (Escada)
 Escada da Árvore
 Escada do Caracol
 Escada do Muro
 Escada do Papel
 Escada Quebra-Costas

Viewing Point (Miradouro)
 Miradouro da Penha
 Miradouro de D. Maria II
 Miradouro de Henry Dunant – named for Red Cross co-founder Henry Dunant. There is a bust of him at the viewing point.
 Miradouro de Nossa Senhora da Guia
 Miradouro de Nossa Senhora da Penha
 Miradouro de Nossa Senhora da Saúde
 Miradouro de Nossa Senhora do Mar
 Miradouro de Santa Sancha

List of Roads on Taipa and Cotai

Street (Rua)

 Rua dos Açores – named for Azores
 Rua de Aveiro – named for Aveiro, Portugal
 Rua da Baía
 Rua da Baía de Nossa Senhora da Esperança – Our Lady of Hope Bay Street
 Rua dos Bem Casados
 Rua de Braga – named for Braga
 Rua de Bragança – named for Bragança, Portugal
 Rua do Cais de Pac On
 Rua de Chaves – named for Chaves, Portugal
 Rua de Chiu Chau – named for Chaozhou
 Rua de Choi Long
 Rua de Chong Heng – named for Chongqing
 Rua Cidade de Lisboa – named for Lisbon
 Rua dos Clérigos
 Rua de Coimbra – named for Coimbra
 Rua do Colégio
 Rua Correia da Silva
 Rua do Cunha – named for Portuguese explorer Tristão da Cunha
 Rua do Delgado
 Rua do Desporto – Sport Street
 Rua Direita Carlos Eugénio
 Rua de Évora – named for Évora
 Rua de Fat San – named for Foshan
 Rua da Felicidade
 Rua Fernão Mendes Pinto – named for Fernão Mendes Pinto
 Rua das Gaivotas
 Rua Governador Tamagnini Barbosa
 Rua da Harmonia
 Rua Heng Long
 Rua Ho Lin Vong
 Rua de Hong Chau – named for Hangzhou
 Rua de Horta e Sousa
 Rua do Jardim
 Rua Um dos Jardins do Oceano
 Rua Dois dos Jardins do Oceano
 Rua Três dos Jardins do Oceano
 Rua Quatro dos Jardins do Oceano
 Rua Cinco dos Jardins do Oceano
 Rua Seis dos Jardins do Oceano
 Rua dos Jogos da Ásia Oriental – East Asian Games Street
 Rua de Kwai Lam – named for Guilin
 Rua de Lagos – named for Lagos
 Rua da Madeira – named for Madeira
 Rua do Meio
 Rua dos Mercadores
 Rua do Minho
 Rua de Montenegro – named for Montenegro
 Rua de Nam Keng – named for Nanjing
 Rua dos Negociantes
 Rua do Pai Kok
 Rua da Patinagem – Ice-skating Street
 Rua de Pequim – named for Beijing
 Rua da Ponta Negra – Black Bridge Street
 Rua do Porto – named for Porto
 Rua do Progresso 
 Rua da Prosperidade
 Rua do Regedor
 Rua da Restauração
 Rua do Retiro
 Rua da Riqueza
 Rua de Sai On – named for Xi'an
 Rua de San Tau – named for Shantou
 Rua de Seng Tou – named for Chengdu
 Rua de Siu Heng – named for Zhaoqing
 Rua de Siu Kuan – named for Shaoguan
 Rua de S. João
 Rua do Sol
 Rua Son Keng
 Rua do Súpico
 Rua de Tai Lin – named for Dalian
 Rua de Tai Pou
 Rua de Ténis
 Rua de Tin Chon – named for Tianjin
 Rua do Tiro – Archery Street
 Rua da Tranquilidade
 Rua das Virtudes
 Rua de Viseu – named for Viseu
 Rua da Vitória
 Rua Wo Mok
 Rua de Zhanjiang – named for Zhanjiang

Avenue and Road (Avenida, Caminho and Estrada)
 Avenida do Aeroporto
 Avenida da Benevolência (Ilhas Hospital Complex)
 Avenida de Cotai 
 Avenida de Carlos da Maia
 Avenida da Cidade Nova – New City Avenue
 Avenida Doutor Henry Fok
 Avenida Dr. Sun Yat Sen – named for Chinese revolutionary leader Sun Yat-sen.
 Avenida da Fraternidade (Ilhas Hospital Complex)
 Avenida de Guimarães – named for Guimarães
 Avenida de Kwong Tung
 Avenida do Estádio
 Avendia do Hospital das Ilhas (Ilhas Hospital Complex)
 Avenida dos Jardins do Oceano
 Avenida dos Jogos da Ásia Oriental
 Avenida Marginal Flor de Lótus
 Avenida da Nave Desportiva
 Avenida Olímpica
 Avenida Padre Tomás Pereira
 Avenida da Praia
 Avenida do Progresso
 Avenida da Prosperidade
 Avenida Son On   
 Avenida Wai Long
 Caminho das Hortas
 Caminho da Povoação de Cheok Ka
 Estrada Almirante Marques Esparteiro
 Estrada Almirante Magalhães Correia – named for former governor Luís Magalhães Correia.
 Estrada da Baía de Nossa Senhora da Esperança – Our Lady of Hope Bay Road
 Estrada do Cais de Pac On
 Estrada Coronel Nicolau de Mesquita
 Estrada do Dique Oeste
 Estrada Flor de Lótus – the lotus is the floral emblem of Macau
 Estrada Governador Albano de Oliveira
 Estrada Governador Nobre de Carvalho – named for Governor of Macau José Manuel de Sousa e Faria Nobre de Carvalho 1966 to 1974
 Estrada do Istmo
 Estrada Lou Lim Ieok – named for Chinese born Macau merchant Lou Lim Ieok
 Estrada Nordeste da Taipa
 Estrada de Pac On
 Estrada Padre Estevão Eusébio Situ
 Estrada da Ponta da Cabrita
 Estrada da Ponte de Pac On
 Estrada dos Sete Tanques

Roundabout and Square (Rotunda, Largo and Praça)

 Largo da Baía
 Largo dos Bombeiros
 Largo Camões
 Largo do Carmo
 Largo Governador Tamagnini Barbosa
 Largo Maia de Magalhães
 Largo de Pac On
 Largo da Ponte
 Largo Sanches Miranda
 Rotunda da Aeronáutica
 Rotunda do Aeroporto
 Rotunda da Central Térmica de Coloane – Coloane Power Plant Roundabout
 Rotunda de Cotai
 Rotunda do Dique Oeste
 Rotunda Dr. Carlos A. Correa Pães d'Assumpção – named for late Chairman of the Macau Legislative Assembly and a member of the Fundação Oriente's Consultative Committee
 Rotunda Dr. Sun Yat Sen
 Rotunda do Estádio – Stadium Roundabout
 Rotunda Flor de Lótus – Lotus Flower Roundabout
 Rotunda do Istmo
 Rotunda dos Jogos da Ásia Oriental
 Rotunda de Leonel de Sousa
 Rotunda Marginal
 Rotunda Ouvidor Arriaga
 Rotunda de Pac On
 Rotunda Padre Tomás Pereira
 Rotunda da Piscina Olímpica – Olympic Swimming Pool Roundabout
 Rotunda Tenente P.J. da Silva Loureiro
 Rotunda da Universidade de Ciência e Tecnologia

Lane, Crescent and Alley (Beco and Travessa)
 Beco da Alegria
 Beco da Baía
 Beco do Desporto
 Beco do Ferreiro
 Beco das Flores
 Beco da Formiga
 Beco do Penacho
 Beco da Pérola
 Beco da Sorte
 Travessa da Boa Vista
 Travessa das Bruxas
 Travessa das Canastras
 Travessa do Carmo
 Travessa da Esperança
 Travessa da Felicidade
 Travessa da Glória
 Travessa Lou Fu
 Travessa dos Mercadores
 Travessa Nova
 Travessa da Povoação de Sam Ka
 Travessa da Rebeca
 Travessa de Santa Gertrudes

Ramp (Calçada and Rampa)
 Calçada do Carmo
 Calçada do Quartel
 Rampa do Observatório
 Rampa da Taipa Grande

Stairs and steps (Escada and Escadaria)
 Escada do Coxo
 Escadaria de Iat Fai

List of Roads in the University of Macau (Taipa)

Street (Rua)
 Rua do Ameixas dos Pêssegos e Peras (private road)
 Rua da Biblioteca Norte (private road)
 Rua da Biblioteca Sul (private road)
 Rua do Elite (private road)
 Rua do Estudioso (private road)
 Rua da Interdisciplinaridade (private road)
 Rua Leste de Investigação Científica
 Rua Norte de Investigação Científica (private road)
 Rua Oeste de Investigação Científica
 Rua da Medicina Compassiva (private road)
 Rua do Pinheiro (private road)
 Rua dos Saberes
 Rua da Sumaúma (private road)

Avenue (Avenida)
 Avenida de Antigos Alunos (private road)
 Avenida Central (private road)
 Avenida do Crisântemo (private road)
 Avenida Lótus (private road)
 Avenida da Perfeição (private road)
 Avenida da Residência (private road)
 Avenida da Saúde
 Avenida do Transporte – where the university's bus terminus is located.
 Avenida da Universidade
 Avenida das Virtudes
 Avenida da Vitória

Lane (Pista)
 1ª Pista do Colégio (private road)
 2ª Pista do Colégio (private road)
 3ª Pista do Colégio (private road)
 4ª Pista do Colégio (private road)
 5ª Pista do Colégio (private road)
 6ª Pista do Colégio (private road)
 1ª Pista do Faculdade (private road)
 2ª Pista do Faculdade (private road)
 3ª Pista do Faculdade (private road)
 4ª Pista do Faculdade (private road)
 5ª Pista do Faculdade (private road)
 6ª Pista do Faculdade (private road)

Roundabouts (Rotunda)
 Rotunda da Sumaúma (private road)
 Rotunda Norte da Universidade
 Rotunda Sul da Universidade

List of Roads on Coloane

Boulevard or Promenade (Alameda)
 Alameda da Harmonia

Street (Rua)

 Rua das Acácias Rubras
 Rua das Albizias
 Rua de António Francisco
 Rua das Árvores do Pagode
 Rua dos Bombaxes
 Rua do Caetano
 Rua das Canforeiras
 Rua de Central Térmica de Coloane
 Rua de Cipreste
 Rua da Cordoaria
 Rua Correia Lemos
 Rua do Estaleiro
 Rua dos Eucaliptos
 Rua da Flor de Merenda
 Rua das Gaivotas
 Rua do Interior
 Rua Um de Ip Heng
 Rua Dois de Ip Heng
 Rua Três de Ip Heng
 Rua dos Jamboleiros
 Rua do Jardim
 Rua Um dos Jardins de Cheoc Van
 Rua Dois dos Jardins de Cheoc Van
 Rua Três dos Jardins de Cheoc Van
 Rua Um de Koi Nga
 Rua Dois de Koi Nga
 Rua das Mangueiras
 Rua Marginal da Concórdia
 Rua das Margoseiras
 Rua do Meio
 Rua dos Navegantes
 Rua dos Negociantes
 Rua de San Lei
 Rua das Schimas
 Rua de S. Francisco Xavier
 Rua do Tassara

Avenue and Road (Avenida, Caminho and Estrada)

 Avenida de Cinco de Outubro
 Avenida da Harmonia
 Avenida de Ip Heng
 Avenida de Lok Koi
 Avenida de Luís de Camões
 Avenida Marginal Flor de Lótus
 Avenida da República
 Avenida de Vale das Borboletas
 Caminho das Águas
 Caminho da Cordoaria
 Caminho da Povoação de Ká-Hó
 Caminho de Tan Fong
 Caminho de Telesat
 Caminho do Quartel de Hac Sá
 Estrada da Aldeia
 Estrada do Altinho de Ká Hó – named for village of Ká-Hó
 Estrada do Alto de Coloane
 Estrada da Barragem de Ká Hó
 Estrada do Campo
 Estrada de Cheoc Van
 Estrada de Hac Sá – named for local Hac Sa Beach
 Estrada de Hac Sá Long Chao Kok
 Estrada do Istmo
 Estrada de Lai Chi Vun
 Estrada Militar
 Estrada de Nossa Senhora de Ká Hó
 Estrada Nova de Hac Sá
 Estrada de Seac Pai Van – Street and nearby park on Coloane named after Seac Pai Van

Alley, Crescent, Yard and Lane (Azinhaga, Beco, Pátio and Travessa)
 Azinhaga dos Amores
 Azinhaga dos Piratas
 Beco do Campo
 Beco do Funil
 Beco do Jardim
 Beco de Lótus
 Beco do Poço
 Beco da Rosa
 Pátio das Flores
 Pátio do Gaio
 Pátio do Gordo
 Pátio da Greta
 Pátio do Sol
 Pátio do Velho
 Travessa do Balichão
 Travessa da Cordoaria
 Travessa do Estaleiro
 Travessa da Formiga
 Travessa da Igreja
 Travessa Um de Long Chao Kok
 Travessa Dois de Long Chao Kok
 Travessa Três de Long Chao Kok
 Travessa da Pipa
 Travessa da República
 Travessa da Taipa
 Travessa das Trinas

Ramp (Calçada and Rampa)
 Calçada do Quartel

Roundabout and Square (Rotunda, Largo and Praça)
 Largo do Bazar
 Largo do Caetano
 Largo do Cais
 Largo da Cordoaria
 Largo do Estaleiro
 Largo da Fonte
 Largo do Matadouro
 Largo do Presidente António Ramalho Eanes
 Largo Tam Kong Miu
 Largo Tin Hau Miu
 Praceta de Seac Pai Van
 Rotunda do Altinho de Ká Hó – named for village of Ká-Hó
 Rotunda da Concórdia
 Rotunda da Harmonia
 Rotunda das Palmeiras

Stairs (Escadaria)
 Escadaria da Praia de Cheoc Van

See also

 Transport in Macau

References

 
Macau
Roads